Mario Tabares (born July 22, 1965) is a former professional tennis player from Cuba. He enjoyed most of his tennis success while playing doubles. During his career, he won one doubles title. He achieved a career-high doubles ranking of world No. 106 in 1993.

Tabares participated in 16 Davis Cup ties for Cuba from 1987 to 1994, posting a 15–17 record in singles and a 7–9 record in doubles.

He and his wife recently opened a tennis store in the heart of Miami named is MT Tennis Touch.

He competes competitively internationally. In April 2010, he became the ITF World Champion in Men's 40 Singles. He also became an ITF World Champion the same year with his brother Alexander Tabares in Men's 35 Doubles.

Doubles titles (6)

Runners-up (5)

External links
 
 
 
 MTTennis

1965 births
Living people
Cuban male tennis players
Cuban emigrants to the United States
People from Havana
Tennis players from Miami
Pan American Games medalists in tennis
Pan American Games bronze medalists for Cuba
Tennis players at the 1991 Pan American Games
Universiade medalists in tennis
Universiade bronze medalists for Cuba
Medalists at the 1987 Summer Universiade
Central American and Caribbean Games medalists in tennis
Central American and Caribbean Games gold medalists for Cuba
Central American and Caribbean Games silver medalists for Cuba
Central American and Caribbean Games bronze medalists for Cuba
Tennis players at the 1987 Pan American Games
Medalists at the 1991 Pan American Games
21st-century Cuban people
20th-century Cuban people